The men's 1500 metres event at the 1959 Pan American Games was held at the Soldier Field in Chicago on 31 August and 2 September.

Medalists

Results

Heats

Final

References

Athletics at the 1959 Pan American Games
1959